Thanasis Kavallaris (Greek: Θανάσης Καβαλλάρης, born 23 January 1988) is a Greek footballer. He is a striker.

External links
profile

1988 births
Living people
Greek footballers
Greek expatriate footballers
AEK Larnaca FC players
ASIL Lysi players
Cypriot Second Division players
Expatriate footballers in Cyprus
Association football forwards
Footballers from Amfilochia